SM UC-59 was a German Type UC II minelaying submarine or U-boat in the German Imperial Navy during World War I. The U-boat was ordered on 12 January 1916, laid down on 25 March 1916, and was launched on 28 September 1916. She was commissioned into the German Imperial Navy on 12 May 1917 as SM UC-59. In nine patrols UC-59 was credited with sinking eight ships, either by torpedo or by mines laid. UC-59 was surrendered on 21 November 1918 and broken up at Bo'ness in 1919 – 20.

Design
A German Type UC II submarine, UC-59 had a displacement of  when at the surface and  while submerged. The submarine was powered by two six-cylinder four-stroke diesel engines each producing  (a total of ), two electric motors producing , and two propeller shafts.

UC-59 was fitted with six  mine tubes, eighteen UC 200 mines, three  torpedo tubes (one on the stern and two on the bow), seven torpedoes, and one  Uk L/30 deck gun. Her complement was twenty-six crew members.

Summary of raiding history

References

Notes

Citations

Bibliography

 
 

Ships built in Danzig
German Type UC II submarines
U-boats commissioned in 1917
World War I minelayers of Germany
World War I submarines of Germany
1916 ships